Steven de Jongh (born 25 November 1973 in Alkmaar) is a Dutch former road bicycle racer.

Biography
De Jongh made his professional debut in 1995 at TVM team where he stayed until 1999. De Jongh retired as a rider after the 2009 season.

He was a Directeur sportif at Team Sky for three years, leaving in October 2012 after admitting he had taken illegal substances earlier in his career. In January 2013 he joined Team Saxo-Tinkoff as a sports director. After the Tinkoff team announced their disbanding at the conclusion of the 2016 season, in September 2016  confirmed that de Jongh would join them from 2017, along with Tinkoff riders Alberto Contador and Jesús Hernández.

Major results

1992
 3rd Dorpenomloop Rucphen
1994
 1st Ronde van Zuid-Holland
 1st Dokkum Woudenomloop
 1st Stage 11 Commonwealth Bank Classic
 1st Stage 2 Tour du Poitou-Charentes
 1st Stage 6 Olympia's Tour
 1st Stage 1 OZ Wielerweekend
 3rd Ster van Zwolle
1995
 1st  Road race, National Under-23 Road Championships
 1st PWZ Zuidenveld Tour
 1st Grand Prix de Waregem
 1st Stage 1 Tour de Pologne
 1st Stages 1, 9 & 10 Tour of Austria
 2nd Ster van Zwolle
 2nd Omloop der Kempen
 3rd Ronde van Drenthe
1996
 4th HEW Cyclassics
 8th Kampioenschap van Vlaanderen
 9th Overall Étoile de Bessèges
 9th Grand Prix d'Ouverture La Marseillaise
1997
 1st Stage 3 Vuelta a Burgos
 1st Stage 2 Tour de l'Avenir
 1st Stage 3 Boland Bank Tour
 4th Overall Tour of Sweden
1998
 1st Overall Tour of Sweden
1st Stage 2
 1st Stage 4 Étoile de Bessèges
 3rd Nationale Sluitingprijs
1999
 1st Stage 7 Tirreno–Adriatico
 1st Stage 4 Vuelta a Castilla y León
 1st Stage 2 Giro della Provincia di Lucca
 2nd Nationale Sluitingprijs
 3rd Overall Guldensporentweedaagse
 3rd Kampioenschap van Vlaanderen
 7th Delta Profronde
 8th Grand Prix d'Isbergues
2000
 1st Henk Vos Memorial
 1st Nationale Sluitingsprijs
 1st Schaal Sels
 1st Veenendaal–Veenendaal
 4th Trofeo Cala Millor-Cala Bona
 7th Kampioenschap van Vlaanderen
2001
 1st Veenendaal–Veenendaal
 3rd Overall Guldensporentweedaagse
2002
 1st Schaal Sels
 1st Rund um den Flughafen Köln-Bonn
 1st Stages 1b & 2 Tour of Sweden
 1st Stage 2 Ronde van Nederland
 2nd Ronde van Midden-Zeeland
 3rd Nokere-Koerse
 4th Road race, National Road Championships
 6th Tour Beneden-Maas
 6th Trofeo Cala Millor-Cala Bona
 8th Henk Vos Memorial
2003
 1st Schaal Sels
 1st E3 Prijs Vlaanderen
 1st Stage 3a Three Days of De Panne
 8th GP Rudy Dhaenens
2004
 1st Kuurne–Brussels–Kuurne
 2nd Overall Circuit Franco-Belge
 2nd Nationale Sluitingprijs
 4th E3 Prijs Vlaanderen
 4th Giro del Piemonte
 10th Ronde van Midden-Zeeland
2005
 1st Nokere Koerse
 2nd Road race, National Road Championships
 2nd Giro del Piemonte
 2nd Noord-Nederland Tour
 2nd Tour de Rijke
 3rd Omloop Het Volk
 3rd Trofeo Manacor
 4th GP Stad Zottegem
 7th Veenendaal–Veenendaal
 10th Overall Ster Elektrotoer
2006
 1st Ronde van Midden-Zeeland
 2nd Scheldeprijs
 2nd Kampioenschap van Vlaanderen
 3rd Paris–Brussels
 4th Veenendaal–Veenendaal
 6th Overall Three Days of De Panne
1st Stage 3
 7th Overall Tour of Qatar
 8th Tour de Rijke
 9th Overall Tour of Belgium
 10th Giro della Provincia di Lucca
2007
 1st GP Briek Schotte
 1st Omloop van het Houtland
 1st Omloop Wase Scheldeboorden
 3rd Overall Tour of Qatar
1st Stage 1
 3rd Memorial Rik Van Steenbergen
 4th Paris–Tours
 5th GP Ouest–France
 5th Paris–Brussels
 9th Tour de Rijke
 10th Omloop Het Volk
2008
 1st Kuurne–Brussels–Kuurne
 1st Tour de Rijke
 2nd Overall Tour of Qatar
1st Stage 1 (TTT)
 2nd Dwars door Vlaanderen
 3rd Road race, National Road Championships
 10th Memorial Rik Van Steenbergen
2009
 1st Kampioenschap van Vlaanderen
 3rd Memorial Rik Van Steenbergen
 3rd Dutch Food Valley Classic
 5th Overall Circuit Franco-Belge
 9th Tour de Rijke

References

External links
Official site

1973 births
Living people
Dutch sportspeople in doping cases
Dutch male cyclists
Sportspeople from Alkmaar
Doping cases in cycling
UCI Road World Championships cyclists for the Netherlands
Cyclists from North Holland
20th-century Dutch people
21st-century Dutch people